Luarsab may refer to:

 Georgian rulers:
 Luarsab I of Kartli (1500s–1550s) 
 Luarsab II of Kartli (1592–1622)
 Luarsab (given name)